National Highway 1 or NH 1 was a National Highway in Northern India that linked the national capital New Delhi to the town of Attari in Punjab near the India–Pakistan border. Old National Highway 1 in its entirety, was part of historic Grand Trunk Road or simply known as GT Road.

New numbering
As of 2010 notification from Ministry of Road Transport and Highways, NH 1 has been renumbered as follows.

Attari - Amritsar - Jalandhar section is part of new National Highway No. 3
Jalandhar - Ludhiana - Ambala - Panipat - Delhi section is part of new National Highway No. 44

National Highways Development Project
Approximately  stretch of the old NH 1 from Jalandhar to Delhi is a part of the North-South Corridor.

See also

 List of National Highways in India (by Highway Number)
 National Highways Development Project

References

External links
 Old NH 1 on OpenStreetMap

1
1
1
1
National highways in India (old numbering)